Stéphane Emmanuel Roy (born 31 May 1968 in Montreal, Quebec) is a Canadian actor, comedian and playwright. He was a member of the comedy group Les Bizarroïdes 1990–2000 with Ken Scott, Martin Petit, and Guy Lévesque.

In 2016, he directed a segment of the collective film 9 (9, le film), which was based on his own theatrical play 9 Variations on the Void (Neuf variations sur le vide).

References

1968 births
Living people
Canadian dramatists and playwrights in French
Canadian male film actors
Canadian male stage actors
Canadian male television actors
Canadian sketch comedians
Canadian television personalities
Comedians from Montreal
Film directors from Montreal
Male actors from Montreal
Television personalities from Montreal
Writers from Montreal
20th-century Canadian dramatists and playwrights
20th-century Canadian male actors
20th-century Canadian male writers
21st-century Canadian dramatists and playwrights
21st-century Canadian male actors
21st-century Canadian male writers
21st-century Canadian screenwriters